Daylesford House is a Georgian country house near Daylesford, Gloucestershire (formerly in Worcestershire until 1931), on the north bank of the River Evenlode near the border with Oxfordshire. The village of Daylesford lies nearby to the west, Adlestrop to the north, Cornwell to the east, and Kingham to the south,

The house has been listed Grade I on the National Heritage List for England since 1960, and its gardens were subsequently Grade II* listed on the Register of Historic Parks and Gardens in 1986.
 
The grounds include an orangery in late 18th century Gothick style, which has a separate Grade I listing. The stable block and ice house in the grounds are also separately Grade II listed.

History
Warren Hastings was descended from the Hastings family that had owned the manor from the 12th to 14th century, and then again from the 15th century until it was sold in 1715 by Hastings's grandfather to a merchant from Bristol, Jacob Knight. Knight began the construction of a new house in about 1730, but the new house remained unfinished when both Knight and his eldest son John died in 1788. Hastings had previously offered twice the value of the land to get the house back, and he finally acquired the estate in 1788 from a younger son Thomas Knight.

The shell was remodelled by Hastings from around 1788 to 1793 to designs by Samuel Pepys Cockerell, architect to the East India Company, to create a broadly Neoclassical house with some features inspired by Indian architectural styles.  Cockerell took the Indian motifs further at Sezincote House, built for his brother Sir Charles Cockerell nearby.

After his death in 1818, Hastings was buried at St Peter's church in Daylesford nearby, and the house was occupied by his widow Marian until her death in 1837, and then by her son (Hastings' stepson) Sir Charles Imhoff until he sold it in 1853 to stockbroker Harman Grisewood.    During Grisewood's period of ownership, alterations were made to the interiors and exteriors by Robert Trollope.  After Grisewood's death in 1874, the house was acquired by R. Nichol Byass, and then it was sold in 1884 to Charles Edward Baring Young.

Daylesford House was occupied by US soldiers in the Second World War and left in a dilapidated state. The house and estate were acquired by Esmond Harmsworth, 2nd Viscount Rothermere in 1946. He restored the house with the help of the architect Philip Jebb and the interior decorator John Beresford Fowler. It was subsequently acquired by Baron Hans Thyssen for £600,000 in the late 1970s. Thyssen hired the Italian designer Lorenzo Mongiardino to redecorate the interior at a cost almost equal to the purchase price of the house. Thyssen subsequently estimated that he had spent £3 million on Daylesford, having renovated houses on the estate and increased the surrounding landholding to 12,000 acres. Thyssen described the expenditure as "...endless, and the weather was appalling, so we only went in the winter so at least we knew what to expect". It was sold in 1986 to Sir Anthony Bamford. The Earl of Snowdon and his family rent a cottage on the estate.

House
The exterior of the house exhibits a plain style of Neoclassicism, based on Palladio, with some fussy French details.  The house has an "H" plan, with a central block of three stories, and wings of two stories, constructed from yellowish Stanway limestone ashlars.

The south front was originally the main entrance, with canted bays at either end, reached by a drive that swept past the main west front.  The main front was originally to the west, at the centre of which is a projecting semicircular bay, with four Ionic pillars and French Neoclassical garland swags around the architrave, topped by a shallow dome with pointed Coade stone finial, and wings projecting to either side.  The oriental-inspired dome predates the publication of architectural aquatints of Thomas Daniell and William Daniell in 1796, and the domes of Sezincote and Brighton Pavilion.  The main entrance was moved to the east front in the 19th century, with the addition of a late 19th century extension with projecting Tuscan porch and portico, and a flat roof.

The interior is decorated in a plain Classical style, with two fireplaces by Thomas Banks and one by John Bacon with Indian motifs.  Hasting's original decoration scheme made frequent use of gold and crimson, and displayed his collection of oriental-style furniture.  The main rooms face south and west, with views downhill over the park, and the services are located on the wood-shrouded northern side.  A circular boudoir in the dome, facing west, was the main state bedroom, has a high domed ceiling, and a segmental bay.

A curved curve stable block is located near the house.

Gardens
Hastings also laid out the gardens and grounds, which were landscaped by John Davenport. To the west of the house is a lawn with views across a ha-ha to the park, and there are terraces to the south and east. A garden of approximately  surrounds the house, with mainly 19th century planting.

In Gothick style, the seven-bay building is constructed from ashlars, with tall pointed windows facing south over the park, a pediment above the central three bays, round wings at either end, and battlements with pinnacles. Many details are based on the pattern books of Batty Langley.

Some of the stonework in the grounds may be derived from the Grey Geese of Adlestrop, a collection of stones (possibly a neolithic monument) found on the top of Adelstrop Hill nearby.

References

 'Parishes: Daylesford', in A History of the County of Worcester: Volume 3 (London, 1913), pp. 334–338. British History Online 
 Daylesford House, Moreton-In-Marsh, England, Parks and Gardens Data Services
 Daylesford House, Royal Horticultural Society
 The Domestic Architecture of Benjamin Henry Latrobe, Michael W. Fazio, Benjamin Henry Latrobe, Patrick A. Snadon, p. 47–50
 The British Country House in the Eighteenth Century, Christopher Christie, p. 10, 80–81
 Views of the seats of noblemen and gentlemen, in England, Wales, Scotland, and Ireland, Volume 6, John Preston Neale, Thomas Moule
 "Daylesford: S. P. Cockerell's Residence for Warren Hastings", Paul F. Norton, Journal of the Society of Architectural Historians, Vol. 22, No. 3 (Oct., 1963), pp. 127–133

Cotswold District
Country houses in Gloucestershire
Gothic Revival architecture in Gloucestershire
Grade I listed houses in Gloucestershire
Grade II* listed parks and gardens in Gloucestershire
Houses completed in 1793
Neoclassical architecture in England
Orangeries